Kabelo Sekhukhune (born 16 July 1997) is a South African cricketer. He made his first-class debut for Easterns in the 2014–15 Sunfoil 3-Day Cup on 6 November 2014. In September 2018, he was named in Easterns' squad for the 2018 Africa T20 Cup. In April 2021, Sekhukhune was named in the South Africa Emerging Men's squad for their six-match tour of Namibia. Later the same month, he was named in Eastern Province's squad, ahead of the 2021–22 cricket season in South Africa.

References

External links
 

1997 births
Living people
South African cricketers
Border cricketers
Easterns cricketers
Cricketers from Johannesburg